Lists of rail accidents by country include:

Africa 
 Egypt - List of rail accidents in Egypt

Asia 
 Bangladesh - List of rail accidents in Bangladesh
 China - List of rail accidents in China
 India - List of Indian rail incidents
 Iran - List of Iranian rail accidents
 Philippines - List of rail accidents in the Philippines
 Sri Lanka - List of rail accidents in Sri Lanka
 Thailand - List of rail accidents in Thailand

Europe 
 Czech Republic - List of Czech rail accidents
 Germany - List of German rail accidents
 Greece - List of rail accidents in Greece
 France - List of rail accidents in France
 Italy- List of rail accidents in Italy
 Ireland - List of Irish railway accidents
 Netherlands - List of rail accidents in the Netherlands
 Russia - List of Russian rail accidents
 Spain - List of rail accidents in Spain
 Turkey - List of rail accidents in Turkey
 United Kingdom - List of rail accidents in the United Kingdom

North America 
 Canada - List of rail accidents in Canada
 United States - List of American railroad accidents

Oceania 
 Australia 
 New South Wales - Railway accidents in New South Wales
 Northern Territory - Railway accidents in the Northern Territory
 Queensland - Railway accidents in Queensland
 South Australia - Railway accidents in South Australia
 Tasmania - Railway accidents in Tasmania
 Victoria - Railway accidents in Victoria
 Western Australia - Railway accidents in Western Australia
 New Zealand - List of rail accidents in New Zealand